The 2018 Bass Pro Shops NRA Night Race is a Monster Energy NASCAR Cup Series race held on August 18, 2018 at Bristol Motor Speedway in Bristol, Tennessee. Contested over 500 laps on the  short track, it was the 24th race of the 2018 Monster Energy NASCAR Cup Series season.

Report

Background

The Bristol Motor Speedway, formerly known as Bristol International Raceway and Bristol Raceway, is a NASCAR short track venue located in Bristol, Tennessee. Constructed in 1960, it held its first NASCAR race on July 30, 1961. Despite its short length, Bristol is among the most popular tracks on the NASCAR schedule because of its distinct features, which include extraordinarily steep banking, an all concrete surface, two pit roads, and stadium-like seating. It has also been named one of the loudest NASCAR tracks.

Entry list

Practice

First practice

Final practice

Qualifying

Qualifying results

Race

Stage Results

Stage 1
Laps: 125

Stage 2
Laps: 125

Final Stage Results

Stage 3
Laps: 250

Race statistics
 Lead changes: 9 among different drivers
 Cautions/Laps: 9 for 70
 Red flags: 0
 Time of race: 2 hours, 58 minutes and 35 seconds
 Average speed:

Media

Television
NBC Sports covered the race on the television side. Rick Allen, 2008 Bristol winner Jeff Burton, Steve Letarte and 2004 Bristol winner Dale Earnhardt Jr. had the call in the booth for the race. Dave Burns, Parker Kligerman, Marty Snider and Kelli Stavast reported from pit lane during the race.

Radio
The Performance Racing Network had the radio call for the race, which was simulcast on Sirius XM NASCAR Radio.

Standings after the race

Drivers' Championship standings

Manufacturers' Championship standings

Note: Only the first 16 positions are included for the driver standings.
. – Driver has clinched a position in the Monster Energy NASCAR Cup Series playoffs.

References

Bass Pro Shops NRA Night Race
Bass Pro Shops NRA Night Race
Bass Pro Shops NRA Night Race
NASCAR races at Bristol Motor Speedway